River Road is a 2014 Chinese film written and directed by Li Ruijun and starring Tang Long and Guo Songtao. It made its world premiere at the 27th Tokyo International Film Festival in 2014.

Synopsis
While their parents graze their sheep far from the town, Adikeer (Tang Long) stays in a boarding school in town and his older brother Bartel (Guo Songtao) lives with their grandfather, a sheep-herder from the Buddhist Yugur ethnic minority. When their father fails to pick them up for summer break and their grandfather dies suddenly, the two brothers embark on a journey with their camels across the vast, dry expanse of Western China alone, in search of their father by following the path of a dried-up river bed.

Cast
 Tang Long as Adikeer
 Guo Songtao as Bartel
 Bai Wenxin as Grandfather
 Guo Jianmin as Father
 Ma Xingchun as Monk

Awards and nominations

Reception
With no big stars and a little-known director, River Road has been largely neglected at the box office from the very beginning, even though domestic film critics like Wei Junzi highly recommended it on Sina Weibo on the day of the premiere. Wei wrote, "River Road uses children's visual angel to tell the past and contemporary of a civilization. Poetic, deliberate, and sad, it is a rare work of Chinese films." Director Li admits that he and executive producer Fang Li had foreseen the situation but what he had not expected was that cinemas would be unwilling to showing his film.

References

External links
 
 

2014 films
Chinese drama films
Films directed by Li Ruijun
2010s Mandarin-language films